Haley Cavinder is an American social media personality and college basketball player for the Miami Hurricanes of the Atlantic Coast Conference (ACC). She began her college career at Fresno State, where she was a three-time All-Mountain West Conference (MW) selection and was named MW Player of the Year in her sophomore season. As a junior, she set the NCAA Division I single-season free throw percentage record, before transferring to Miami.

Cavinder and her fraternal twin and teammate, Hanna, have a large social media following and share a TikTok account with millions of followers. They are leading figures in college sports endorsements, signing name, image and likeness (NIL) deals with several companies, including Boost Mobile and WWE, and co-founding the clothing company Baseline Team.

Early life and high school career
Cavinder was born in South Bend, Indiana, one minute before and one pound (454 g) heavier than her twin sister Hanna. The family moved to the Phoenix area in the twins' early childhood. She started playing basketball before preschool and watched drills on YouTube to improve her skills. Cavinder competed in boys leagues until sixth grade before playing against girls who were two to three years older than her. She also played soccer and volleyball before focusing on basketball in middle school. She emulated her game after Skylar Diggins-Smith.

Cavinder played for Gilbert High School in Gilbert, Arizona, alongside her twin sister, Hanna, and another sister, Brandi, who was two years ahead of them in school. The Cavinder twins were drawn there by coach Kyle Pedersen, who had trained them since they were in sixth grade and was their coach with Arizona Elite Basketball Club. As a freshman at Gilbert, Cavinder assumed a leading role along with Hanna, and helped the team reach the state quarterfinals. In her junior season, Cavinder averaged 23 points, 9.2 rebounds, 6.6 assists and 3.9 steals per game, leading Gilbert to the Class 6A state semifinals. She earned most valuable player honors at the Nike Tournament of Champions, an annual high school competition. As a senior, she averaged 21.8 points, 8.9 rebounds and 6.5 assists per game, helping her team reach the Class 5A state title game. She was named Arizona 5A Player of the Year and finished with 2,282 career points.

College career
On February 1, 2020, Cavinder scored 31 points, a Fresno State single-game freshman record, along with six assists and five steals, in an 84–78 win against New Mexico. As a freshman, she averaged 15.7 points, 7.2 rebounds and 3.6 assists per game. Cavinder recorded the most points (512) and rebounds (233) by a freshman in program history. She was named Mountain West Freshman of the Year and to the All-Mountain West and All-Freshman Teams.

Cavinder scored a sophomore season-high 30 points in a 78–70 win over Nevada on January 14, 2021. As a sophomore, she averaged a conference-high 19.8 points, 7.5 rebounds, 3.8 assists and 1.7 steals per game, leading Fresno State to the second round of the Women's National Invitation Tournament. Cavinder became the fastest Fresno State player to reach 1,000 career points. She was named Mountain West Player of the Year, becoming the third sophomore to win the award. She earned All-Mountain West honors for a second straight season.

As a junior in 2021–22, Cavinder led the Bulldogs in scoring (19.8 per game), rebounding (9.4), and assists (5.8) on her way to her third straight All-Mountain West selection. She also had three triple-doubles, second in NCAA Division I to Iowa's Caitlin Clark and the most all-time by a Fresno State player. Cavinder set a new Division I single-season record for free throw percentage, with 97.3%. Following the season, the Cavinder twins entered the NCAA transfer portal and eventually announced on April 21, 2022 that they would transfer to the University of Miami. Both twins had two years of remaining athletic eligibility at the time of their transfer, because the NCAA did not count the 2020–21 season, extensively disrupted by COVID-19, against the eligibility of any basketball player. On February 9, 2023, Cavinder scored a career-high 33 points, shooting 7-of-10 from three-point range, in an 86–82 win over 19th-ranked Florida State. She was named second-team All-Atlantic Coast Conference (ACC).

Social media and endorsements

Cavinder has established a large social media following with Hanna. In April 2020, while bored at home during the COVID-19 pandemic, she was persuaded by Hanna, who used TikTok, to make videos together on a shared account on the platform. The videos feature Cavinder and her sister performing synchronized dances, dribbling and lip syncing side-by-side. By April 2022, the twins had four million followers on TikTok.

The Cavinder twins have made national headlines for their success with college sports endorsements and are among the most prominent college athletes in the field. On July 1, 2021, after the NCAA began allowing student-athletes to be compensated for the use of their name, image and likeness (NIL), the twins signed deals with Boost Mobile within minutes of it being permitted. On December 8, 2021, they signed with professional wrestling promotion WWE as part of its new Next In Line program to develop college athletes into potential WWE wrestlers. On January 18, 2022, the twins announced that they had co-founded the streetwear clothing startup Baseline Team. They were given 25 percent equity stake in the company and one of three seats on the board of directors. The twins have also signed NIL deals with Champs Sports, Eastbay, Gopuff and SoFi, among other companies. In July 2022, Forbes estimated that they had earned $1.7 million in endorsement deals. By November 2022, they had over 40 deals, more than any other women's basketball players at any level. The twins also started a podcast, Twin Talk, in December 2022 on iHeartRadio that initially focuses on student-athletes' perspectives on NIL; the twins' first official guest was LSU gymnast and leading NIL figure Olivia Dunne.

In early 2023, the twins were involved in the first known NCAA sanctions case related to NIL opportunities. On February 24, the Miami women's basketball program was placed on a year of probation and received other minor penalties; the twins received no direct sanctions. The NCAA found that the program and its head coach Katie Meier had violated NCAA rules by facilitating a meeting between the Cavinders and Miami-based businessman John Ruiz, a Miami alumnus and booster who has signed over 100 Hurricanes athletes in various sports to NIL deals, before they officially committed to transferring to the school.

Personal life
Cavinder is the daughter of Katie and Tom Cavinder. She has four sisters, including a fraternal twin, Hanna. Her father played college basketball at Nova Southeastern and is the founder and CEO of Southwest Elevator. At the California State University, Fresno, Cavinder was a business major with a focus on marketing. As a sophomore at Fresno State, she was named to the Division I Academic All-District 8 first team by the College Sports Information Directors of America (since renamed College Sports Communicators). She and her twin sister are represented by Everett Sports Marketing.

Notes

References

External links
 Fresno State Bulldogs bio

2001 births
Living people
American TikTokers
American women podcasters
American women's basketball players
Basketball players from Arizona
People from Gilbert, Arizona
Basketball players from South Bend, Indiana
Fresno State Bulldogs women's basketball players
Miami Hurricanes women's basketball players
Point guards